Vladimir Horvat (12 June 1926 – 14 May 1984) was a Croatian rower. He competed in the men's eight event at the 1952 Summer Olympics.

References

1926 births
1984 deaths
Croatian male rowers
Olympic rowers of Yugoslavia
Rowers at the 1952 Summer Olympics